Roger Token is a Papua New Guinean weightlifter. He competed in the men's middleweight event at the 1988 Summer Olympics.

References

External links

Year of birth missing (living people)
Living people
Papua New Guinean male weightlifters
Olympic weightlifters of Papua New Guinea
Weightlifters at the 1988 Summer Olympics
Place of birth missing (living people)